Félix María Vásquez Espinal (born 5 April 1943) is a businessman, philanthropist, and politician from the Dominican Republic. He is Senator for the province of Sánchez Ramírez, elected in 2006, and re-elected in 2010 with 55.14% of the votes.

Vásquez was born into a poor family. He and a brother won a scholarship that allowed them to study in a college. He graduated with a Master's degree in Farming and joined the Dominican Air Force in the Early 1960s. In 1964 he moved to Cotuí, Sánchez Ramírez, to work in the branch of the state-owned Agricultural Bank, five years later, he started a private business. In 1995, he founded the Fundación Félix Vásquez foundation. He has been Secretary of State-Advisor and Deputy.

References 

Living people
1943 births
People from Dajabón Province
Dominican Republic businesspeople
Social Christian Reformist Party politicians
Dominican Liberation Party politicians
Dominican Republic philanthropists
Dominican Republic military personnel
Members of the Senate of the Dominican Republic
White Dominicans